Karuvattu Mana Vasudevan Namboothiri (born 13 September 1925), better known simply as Namboothiri, is an Indian painter and sculptor, known for his line art and copper relief works. He has done illustrations for many Malayalam writers such as Thakazhy Shivasankara Pillai, Kesavadev, M. T. Vasudevan Nair, Uroob, S. K. Pottekkatt, Edasseri Govindan Nair, and V.K.N. and is reported to be one of the most prolific literary illustrators in the world. He is a former chairman of the Kerala Lalithakala Akademi. The Akademi awarded him the Raja Ravi Varma Award in 2003. He is also a recipient of the Kerala State Film Award for Best Art Director.

Biography 

Namboothiri was born on 13 September 1925 at Karuvattu Mana in Ponnani, in Malappuram district of the south Indian state of Kerala to Parameshwaran Namboothiri and Sreedevi Antharjanam, as their eldest son. During his childhood, he was influenced by the sculptures at the Sukapuram temple near his house. "I had this urge to draw and mould sculptures after seeing these," says Namboothiri. In order to pursue education in art, he moved to Chennai, with financial assistance from Krishnan Namboodiri of Varikkasseri Mana, to join the Government College of Fine Arts, Chennai where he had the opportunity to study under Debi Prasad Roy Chowdhury, the founder principal of the institution and S. Dhanapal. It was during this period, he came into contact with K. C. S. Paniker who would exercise influence over the young artist.

Namboothiri secured two diplomas, one in fine arts and the other in applied arts, from the Government College of Fine Arts in 1954 and after staying at Cholamandal Artists' Village of K. C. S. Paniker where he completed a six-year course in one year, he returned to Kerala to join Mathrubhumi weekly as a staff artist in 1960. He stayed with Mathrubhumi until 1982 during which period, he illustrated the literary works of most of the major writers in Malayalam including Thakazhi Sivasankara Pillai, Kesavadev, M. T. Vasudevan Nair, Uroob, S. K. Pottekkatt, Edasseri Govindan Nair, and V.K.N. It was in Mathrubhumi, he published Naniyammayum Lokavum, which became a popular pocket cartoon series. In 1982, he moved to Kalakaumudi weekly where he provided illustrations for some more time before shifting to Samakalika Malayalam Vaarika of The New Indian Express.

Namboothiri is married to Mrinalini and the couple has two sons, Parameshawaran and Vasudevan. The family lives in Naduvattam Near Edappal in Malappuram district.

Legacy 

One of the first professional assignments done by Namboothiri was during his Chennai days, when he assisted K. C. S. Paniker to complete an oversize painting for the Indian Railways. One of the most prolific literary illustrators in the world, he turned to copper relief work after resigning from Mathrubhumi and soon organized an exhibition consisting of 12 relief works. Later, he did some of his most notable drawings at Kalakaumudi when he illustrated Randamoozham of M. T. Vasudevan Nair; he confessed later that these illustrations provided him satisfaction. Namboothiri's illustrations of his characters prompted V. K. N. to call the artist as the Paramashivan of line sketches (The Lord Shiva of Line Drawings). He is also a proponent of "finger painting". Among the copper relief works, he has done a series based on various events from Mahabharata, titled Lohabharata, and another based on Parayi Petta Panthirukulam. He has created a few large sculptures for Cholamandal which include Modern Family on a Scooter and Maithuna as well as a 500 ft long outdoor drawing featuring incidents from the Indian freedom movement.

Namboothiri has served as the chairman of the Kerala Lalitakala Academy twice and it was during his tenure that the academy constructed and moved to an owned building in Thrissur. His contributions are also reported in the conversion of the Durbar Hall Ground in Kochi into an art gallery. He has embarked on a self appointed mission of pictorially documenting the cities of Kerala; the project, titled Nagarangal (The Cities), has been started with Kochi.

Honours

G. Aravindan, the award-winning film director and cartoonist, was a friend of Namboothiri and when Aravindan made his debut movie, Uttarayanam, he invited Namboothiri to work as the art director of the film. The film went on to receive five Kerala State Film Awards in 1974 including the Award for Best Art Director for Namboothiri. Kerala Lalithakala Akademi awarded Namboothiri the Raja Ravi Varma Award in 2003 and he became the third recipient of the award which was instituted in 2001. The Kerala State Institute for Children's Literature awarded him the Bala Sahitya Award for best illustration for his work in Kuttikalude Ramayanam (Ramayana for children) in 2004.

A documentary on the life of the artist, Namboodiri-Varayude Kulapathy (Namboodiri — The Emperor of Lines) has been made by Ask Movies. The 44-minute documentary film, directed by Binuraj Kalapeedhom, covers the artist's life from his childhood through his Chennai days to his eighties. Varayum Vaakkum, (Lines and Words) is a book published by N. P. Vijayakrishnan, compiling Namboothiri's reminiscences and some of his drawings. Namboothiriyude Sthreekal (The Women of Namboothiri) is another book published by Vijayakrishan which has several of the artist's line drawings if women; the book also has a foreword by Mohanlal.

Bibliography
 Randamoozham by M. T. Vasudevan Nair, illustrated by Namboothiri (Current Books).
 Calicut: the City of Truth revisited by M. G. S. Narayanan, illustrations by Artist Namboodiri and Madanan, 2006 (University of Calicut).
 Lore and Legends of Kerala: Selections from Kottarathil Sankunni's Aithihyamala, translated from Malayalam by T. C. Narayan, illustrated by C. N. Karunakaran and Namboodiri, 2009 (Malayala Manorama & Oxford University Press).
 Antharjanam: Memoirs of a Nambooodiri Woman by Devaki Nilayamgode, translated from Malayalam by Indira Menon and Radhika P. Menon, illustrations by Namboodiri, 2011 (Oxford University Press).
 Sketches: the memoir of an artist, by K.M. Vasudevan Namboodiri, foreword by M.T. Vasudevan Nair, translated from the Malayalam by Gita Krishnankutty, 2019 (Penguin Books India).

Gallery

Notes

References

External links

K. M. Vasudevan Namboodiri at Penguin India
 
 
 

20th-century Indian painters
Indian cartoonists
Indian children's book illustrators
People from Malappuram district
Living people
1925 births
Artists from Kerala
Indian male sculptors
Indian contemporary sculptors
20th-century Indian sculptors
Painters from Kerala
Indian male painters
Indian contemporary painters
Government College of Fine Arts, Chennai alumni
Malayali people
Kerala State Film Award winners
20th-century Indian male artists
21st-century Indian male artists